John Richard Wardley (born 6 June 1950) is a British developer for theme parks in the UK and Europe: an innovator of special effects, dark rides and roller coasters in the themed attraction industry.

Career
Wardley started his career as a stage manager at Windsor's Theatre Royal, then moved on to the film industry creating special effects, including several of the James Bond movies. He was later hired by the Tussauds Group due to his experience in designing animated figures and rides for amusement parks. His first project with Tussauds was the development of animatronics for the 'Royalty and Empire' exhibition at Windsor, Berkshire.

After this he was employed by the Tussauds Group to transform the declining Chessington Zoo in London to become the Chessington World of Adventures theme park. There, Wardley oversaw the production of attractions including The Vampire suspended coaster and the Dragon River log flume. Wardley collaborated with attraction developer Keith Sparks to produce the popular Prof. Burp's Bubble Works dark ride at Chessington World of Adventures in 1990 and The Haunted House at Alton Towers in 1992.

Continuing as a development director of the Tussauds Group, John produced roller coasters such as Nemesis, Oblivion and Air at Alton Towers. He also produced several rides at Thorpe Park after its acquisition by Tussauds in 1998.

One of his other projects at this time was producing the Mystique show at Blackpool Pleasure Beach, with leisure developer Geoffrey Thompson, which ran for nearly 20 years.

Wardley also worked with Chris Sawyer and Frontier Developments for RollerCoaster Tycoon 3, a game about amusement park management. His name is also a secret cheat code in the game - when visitor's title is named after him all height restrictions are removed, alluding to the severe height restrictions that his most well-known work at Alton Towers was required to comply with.

Having completed Air in 2002, Wardley left Tussauds due to its acquisition by Charterhouse. However, Merlin Entertainments took over the company in May 2007 and invited Wardley back as a ride design consultant. He has consulted on various rollercoaster projects, such as SAW - The Ride and The Swarm at Thorpe Park, TH13TEEN and The Smiler at Alton Towers, and Raptor at Gardaland.

On 22 January 2013, Wardley announced his retirement. In April 2013, he published an autobiography entitled Creating My Own Nemesis.

Despite retirement, he consulted on the design for Flug Der Dämonen at Heide Park in 2014 and the Wicker Man at Alton Towers in 2017. As of 2022, he remains a consultant for Alton Towers.

Video games
RollerCoaster Tycoon 3 - consultation
NoLimits Coaster 2 - technical adviser

Publishing history
Creating My Own Nemesis - print edition (April 2013) - author
Creating My Own Nemesis - audiobook (December 2017) - author & narrator
Creating My Own Nemesis - kindle edition (December 2017) - author & narrator

Attraction projects

Further reading
 Interview with John Wardley ahead of his retirement
 Interview with John Wardley in Park World magazine

References

External links
 
 

1950 births
Living people
Amusement ride manufacturers
Animatronic engineers
People from Eastcote
Roller coaster designers